Lula Mae Hardaway (January 11, 1930 – May 31, 2006) was an American songwriter and the mother of soul musician Stevie Wonder. She spent her early adult life in Saginaw, Michigan, but from 1975 until her death in 2006, lived in Los Angeles, California.

Life 
Hardaway co-wrote many of her son's songs during his teenage years, including the hit singles "I Was Made to Love Her", "Signed, Sealed, Delivered I'm Yours", "You Met Your Match" and "I Don't Know Why I Love You", co-writing four songs on the 1968 album For Once in My Life. For co-writing "Signed, Sealed, Delivered", she was co-nominated for the 1970 Grammy Award for Best R&B Song.

In 1974, Hardaway was with her then 23-year-old son at the Hollywood Palladium when he received his first Grammy, one of several he received that night.

Legacy
Hardaway was the subject of a 2002 authorized biography entitled Blind Faith: The Miraculous Journey of Lula Hardaway, Stevie Wonder's Mother by Dennis Love and Stacy Brown.

When she died in 2006, she had 20 grandchildren and great-grandchildren. A service for her was held at West Angeles Church of God in Christ. There were remarks by Motown founder Berry Gordy and songs by gospel singer Yolanda Adams and others. She is interred at Forest Lawn Memorial Park in Glendale, California.

References

External links 
 
 

1930 births
2006 deaths
Songwriters from Alabama
People from Eufaula, Alabama
Musicians from Saginaw, Michigan
American women songwriters
Songwriters from Michigan
20th-century American musicians
Stevie Wonder
20th-century American women musicians
Burials at Forest Lawn Memorial Park (Glendale)